The Aeon Display and Security System is a Burmese company, with headquarters at, Kamayut Township, Yangon, Burma. Aeon is a sole agent company of Samsung Techwin, a privately held Korean company. Aeon is mainly engaged in distributing display and security system from Samsung Techwin.

History
Aeon is formed in late 2010 under supervision of Samsung Techwin. Aeon has engaged both private and government sectors in Burma since it was established. It was the first company to distribute non Chinese Made CCTVs in Burma and it is widely recognized for replacing Chinese CCTV and Security System brands in the country. It is the first company to distribute Large Format Display and Video Walls in Burma, Samsung LFDs can be found in shopping malls and government buildings in Burma.

Products
 Surveillance: CCTV (Surveillance) Systems, modules, etc.
 Access Control
 Video Door Entry System
 Large Format Display

See also
Samsung Group
Samsung Techwin

References

External links
Samsung Techwin Official Site

Companies based in Yangon
Samsung subsidiaries
Privately held companies